The Jakobson Shipyard, Inc. was a shipyard involved in manufacture of tugs, ferries, submarines, minesweepers, yachts, fireboats and other craft, based in Brooklyn, New York from 1926–1938, and Oyster Bay, New York from 1938-1984.

History
Note: Ship names utilized are the Original Names with text in italics. The numbers in parentheses following the Original Name is the Hull Number.

The Jakobson Shipyard, Inc. traces its origins to founder Daniel Jakobson, who established the Jakobson & Peterson shipyard in Brooklyn, New York in 1895. Jakobson was a native of Sweden who immigrated to the United States in 1877. His son, Irving Jakobson, succeeded him as President in 1925. The elder Jakobson died November 28, 1931 at his residence on 370 Senator Street in Brooklyn.

The firm operated in Brooklyn until around 1938 when it was decided to move to Oyster Bay, New York. As many as 700 people worked at Jakobson's during the height of production around World War II.

Four diesel-electric tugboats were built and launched for the Lehigh Valley Railroad from 1948 and 1950. These include the Wilkes-Barre (327), Hazelton (328), Cornell (329), and Lehigh (330). Of these, the tugboat Cornell is the last in service. These diesel tugs were meant to replace steam driven tugs used by the railroad in New York Harbor for towing car floats and barges. Among the benefits that came from diesel were eliminating time lost for fueling.

Jakobson's produced and launched three fireboats for the City of Baltimore in 1960. These were the Mayor J. Harold Grady (397), P.W. Wilkinson (398), and August Emrich (399).

The State of New York provided $5 million to buy the shipyard in 1997, from funds in the state's 1972 Environmental Quality Bond Act. The money had been previously designated for a waste incinerator on Long Island that had never been built. Gov. George E. Pataki speaking at that time said, "This cooperative purchase will recapture an important part of Oyster Bay's waterfront and the area's unique maritime character."

Officers and key staff around the time Jakobson's stopped operation were Mr. George J. Hossfeld, President; Mr. John Hossfeld, Shipyard Manager; Mr. William R. Gordon, Vice President; and Ms. Robin Ritter, Office Manager. The publication Worldwide ship and boat repair facilities published around the time of closing described the firm as follows:
Operates vessel repair, upgrades, yacht and small boat repowering and full service boat marina facility. With 2 marine railways to 235’ and 1,500 LT, 2,000 feet of total berthing, buildingways, and shops.

Register of Ships Produced
Data in these tables is from Tim Colton's
 web site.

Built in Brooklyn (by Jakobson & Petersen)

Built in Oyster Bay (by Jakobson Shipyard)

See also
 List of sailboat designers and manufacturers

References

External links

Water transportation in the United States
American boat builders

Yacht building companies
Shipyards of New York (state)